In algebraic geometry, a finite morphism between two affine varieties  is a dense regular map which induces isomorphic inclusion  between their coordinate rings, such that  is integral over .

Definition by Schemes 
A morphism f: X → Y of schemes is a finite morphism if Y has an open cover by affine schemes

such that for each i,

is an open affine subscheme Spec Ai, and the restriction of f to Ui, which induces a ring homomorphism

makes Ai a finitely generated module over Bi. One also says that X is finite over Y.

In fact, f is finite if and only if for every open affine open subscheme V = Spec B in Y, the inverse image of V in X is affine, of the form Spec A, with A a finitely generated B-module.

For example, for any field k,  is a finite morphism since  as -modules. Geometrically, this is obviously finite since this is a ramified n-sheeted cover of the affine line which degenerates at the origin. By contrast, the inclusion of A1 − 0 into A1 is not finite. (Indeed, the Laurent polynomial ring k[y, y−1] is not finitely generated as a module over k[y].) This restricts our geometric intuition to surjective families with finite fibers.

Properties of finite morphisms 
 The composition of two finite morphisms is finite.
 Any base change of a finite morphism f: X → Y is finite. That is, if g: Z → Y is any morphism of schemes, then the resulting morphism X ×Y Z → Z is finite. This corresponds to the following algebraic statement: if A and C are (commutative) B-algebras, and A is finitely generated as a B-module, then the tensor product A ⊗B C is finitely generated as a C-module. Indeed, the generators can be taken to be the elements ai ⊗ 1, where ai are the given generators of A as a B-module.
 Closed immersions are finite, as they are locally given by A → A/I, where I is the ideal corresponding to the closed subscheme.
 Finite morphisms are closed, hence (because of their stability under base change) proper. This follows from the going up theorem of Cohen-Seidenberg in commutative algebra.
 Finite morphisms have finite fibers (that is, they are quasi-finite). This follows from the fact that for a field k, every finite k-algebra is an Artinian ring. A related statement is that for a finite surjective morphism f: X → Y, X and Y have the same dimension.
 By Deligne, a morphism of schemes is finite if and only if it is proper and quasi-finite. This had been shown by Grothendieck if the morphism f: X → Y is locally of finite presentation, which follows from the other assumptions if Y is Noetherian.
 Finite morphisms are both projective and affine.

See also 
Glossary of algebraic geometry
Finite algebra

Notes

References

External links

Algebraic geometry
Morphisms